The CSI 100 Index is a capitalization-weighted, free float adjusted stock market index designed to replicate the performance of top 100 stocks traded in the Shanghai and Shenzhen stock exchanges. It is a sub-index of CSI 300 Index.

The index is compiled by the China Securities Index.

Its value is normalized relative to a base of 1000 on 30 December 2005.

CSI 100 Index was considered as an index for big caps.

Constituents

Change history

See also
 SSE 50 Index, an index for top 50 companies in Shanghai Stock Exchange 
 SZSE 100 Index, an index for top 100 companies in Shenzhen Stock Exchange

References

Chinese stock market indices
Shanghai Stock Exchange
Shenzhen Stock Exchange
Lists of companies of China